The 1947–48 Sussex County Football League season was the 23rd in the history of the competition.

League table
The league featured 14 clubs which competed in the last season, no new clubs joined the league this season.

League table

References

1947-48
9